Frank Anzalone (born March 15, 1954) is a retired American ice hockey coach who led the Lake Superior State Lakers to their first national title in 1988.

Career

Playing
Anzalone kicked off a brief playing career when he laced up for New Hampshire in 1973–74, recording 13 points in 29 games. The following season saw him appear in only one match before he transferred, appearing for Erie CC almost two years later. Anzalone concluded his collegiate career after the 1977–78 season and made a brief appearance for the Erie Blades of the short-lived NEHL before retiring as a player.

Coaching
Anzalone got his first opportunity as head coach when he took over for the Waterloo Black Hawks in 1980–81, replacing Ken Yackel mid-season. The next year saw him as the full-time GM/head coach for the competing USHL team, Austin Mavericks. The team finished with an even record (24-24) and after the season Anzalone move on to accept an assistant coaching position at Lake Superior State. Anzlone soon found himself in a new position when Lakers head coach Bill Selman resigned mid-season to move back to St. Louis with Anzalone chosen as his successor.

Anzalone finished out his first partial season with a 5-10-1 record before he began building Lake Superior State into a decade-long powerhouse. he got the Lakers to an 18-20-2 mark in 1983–84 and the following year got the Lakers to a 27-win season, their first 20+ win season in 10 years. 1985 was also the first time Lake Superior had ever made an NCAA tournament appearance. The Lakers produced two more 20-win seasons the next two years before Anzalone led them to their breakout year. The 1987–88 Lakers won only their second regular season conference title (the first in 14 years) en route to the team's first ever 30-win season. The successful campaign allowed the Lakers to not only be invited to the 1988 NCAA Tournament, but receive a bye into the Quarterfinals despite losing the CCHA Title Game. After an initial setback against Merrimack, the Lakers rallied to take the series, meeting Maine in the semifinals. After downing the Black Bears 6–3, only St. Lawrence stood in their way of the National Title. In the end the Lakers were victorious, topping the Saints 4–3 in overtime. over the next two years Anzalone led the Lakers back to the NCAA tournament, but was unable to replicate the success of '88 and after the 1989–90 season he left Sault Ste. Marie to become a head coach in the AHL.

Anzalone's first season as the coach of a professional team landed flat and the Newmarket Saints finished dead last in their conference leading to his dismissal at the end of the season. The following year, now behind the bench for the Nashville Knights of the ECHL Anzalone was once again leading a cellar-dweller but wasn't given the opportunity to complete the year, being replaced by Nick Fotiu during the campaign. Anzalone took a season off before returning to coach an ECHL team, this time with the Roanoke Express. Anzalone was able to do much more with the Express, helping them reach the playoffs in each of his five seasons as head coach before he was once again offered an AHL job. He led the 1998–99 Lowell Lock Monsters to the playoffs with a (just barely) winning record but wasn't retained after the playoffs and found himself back in the ECHL the next season. Anzalone coached the Pee Dee Pride for 83 games before being replaced in the early part of the 2000–01 season.

Not out of work for long, it was announced in the spring of 2001 that Anzalone would return to the Lakers after they had fired Scott Borek. Lake Superior had fallen on hard times under Borek's five years and were looking for Anzalone to return them to their earlier success but his second stint in Sault Ste. Marie didn't bear fruit. In four seasons the Lakers never reached double-digit wins and finished last in the conference twice. Anzalone surrendered the reigns after the 2004–05 season and returned to the ECHL the following year. Anzalone coached the Johnstown Chiefs for two seasons, making the playoffs in both, before retiring following the 2007 playoffs.

Anzalone resurfaced a few years later to coach the Quad City Mallards for two years before retiring from coaching and becoming an amateur scout for the Calgary Flames. Anzalone remained in that position for two seasons before retiring from professional hockey following the 2012–13 season.

Head coaching record

College

References

External links

LSSU bio 

1954 births
Living people
American ice hockey coaches
Calgary Flames scouts
ECHL coaches
Erie Blades players
Ice hockey coaches from New York (state)
Johnstown Chiefs coaches
Lake Superior State Lakers men's ice hockey coaches
New Hampshire Wildcats men's ice hockey players
Newmarket Saints
Sportspeople from Brooklyn
Ice hockey players from New York (state)